Handball competition of the 2018 Central American and Caribbean Games in Barranquilla was held from 20 July to 1 August at the Coliseo Colegio Sagrado Corazón de Jesús. The top three teams in both genders qualified to the 2019 Pan American Games.

Medal summary

Medalists

Medal table

Qualification

Men's tournament
All times are local (UTC−5).

Group stage

Group A

Group B

Fifth to eighth place classification

5–8th place semifinals

Seventh place game

Fifth place game

First to fourth place classification

Semifinals

Third place game

Final

Final standing

Top scorers

Women's tournament

Group stage

Group A

Group B

Fifth to eighth place classification

5–8th place semifinals

Seventh place game

Fifth place game

First to fourth place classification

Semifinals

Third place game

Final

Final standing

Top scorers

References

External links
2018 Central American and Caribbean Games – Handball 

2018 Central American and Caribbean Games events
Central American and Caribbean Games
Handball at the Central American and Caribbean Games
Qualification tournaments for the 2019 Pan American Games
Central American and Caribbean Games